Lorrha (from ) is a small village at the northern tip of County Tipperary, Ireland. It is located on a minor road between the R489 Birr to Portumna road and the N65 Nenagh to Portumna road about five kilometres east of the point where the River Shannon enters Lough Derg.

It is also the name of a townland and a civil parish in the historical  barony of Ormond Lower. The civil parish borders Portumna in County Galway and Birr in County Offaly.

History
In 843 a Norse expedition led by Turgesius raided Lorrha and the neighbouring settlement of Terryglass.  Close to an historic crossing point of the River Shannon, the area has a long history of bridges and ferry crossings. The present Portumna bridge dates from 1911  (opening section replaced October 2008 )

Ecclesiastic ruins
Lorrha has a rich ecclesiastical history evidenced by the ruins within the village. Beside the Roman Catholic Church (c. 1912), at the south of the village are the remains of a Dominican Friary founded in the 13th century by Walter de Burgh, Earl of Ulster.  To the east of the village stands the Church of Ireland on the site of St. Ruadhan's church which was built c. 1000 AD and was itself built on the site of St. Ruadhan's Abbey, founded in the 6th century. Remains of two 8th-century high crosses stand in the churchyard.  The Augustinian Abbey founded in the 12th century by the Order of Canons Regular stands nearby. The carved head over the door is thought to represent the wife of Walter De Burgh. Water for the monastic settlement was supplied from St. Ruadhan's well located south of the road that passes the present Church of Ireland cemetery.

The Lorrha Missal, a translation of the Latin and Gaelic Missal was transcribed at Lorrha  in the 9th century. It is now commonly known as the Stowe Missal.

Annalstic references
See Annals of Inisfallen
 AI707.2 Colmán, abbot of Lothra, rested.
 AI747a.1 Kl. Repose of Dúngal, abbot of Lothra. The slaying of Aed Dub.
 AI780.1 Kl. Repose of Ailill, abbot of Lothra.
 AI809.1 Kl. Coibdenach the learned, abbot of Lothra, [rested].
 AI1015.10 The vacating of Imlech Ibuir, and the invasion of Lothra.

Notable buildings

Lackeen Castle, A Kennedy stronghold occasionally open to the public (built 12th century, rebuilt 16th century). It was here that the Lorrha Missal was rediscovered inside a stone wall in the 18th century.
Redwood Castle. Norman castle (built c. 1200).
Abbeville. Small country house (built c. 1840 adjoining earlier structure).
The Church of Ireland features a stained glass window from the An Túr Gloine studio by Michael Healy depicting The Holy Women at the Tomb (1918).

Religion
For those residents of a Christian faith Lorrha has both an active Roman Catholic and Anglican church. Lorrha is an ecclesiastical parish in the Roman Catholic Diocese of Killaloe.

Sport and recreation
Lorrha–Dorrha is the local GAA sports club. Several well known players have had Lorrha–Dorrha connections, see notable people below.

Lorrha is on the route of the Ormond Way which forms part of the Beara-Breifne Way, a long distance walking and cycling trail from the Beara Peninsula in County Cork to Blacklion in County Cavan.

Representation
Lorrha East and Lorrha West are both in the Dáil constituency of Offaly which incorporates 24 electoral divisions that were previously in the Tipperary North Dáil constituency.

Notable people
Ruadán mac Fergusa Birn, 6th century founder and first abbot of the monastery of Lorrha.
Cú Connacht mac Dundach, King of Síol Anmchadha, (died 1006 near Lorrha)
Martin O'Meara VC (born 1882 in Sharragh, Lorrha), recipient of the Victoria Cross
Martin Charles Reddington (born 1919), retired Irish sportsperson who played hurling for Lorrha-Dorrha GAA.
Liam King (born 1940 in Lorrha) retired Irish sportsperson
John McIntyre (born 1961 in  Lorrha) Irish hurling manager and former player
James Kenneth Hogan (born 1963 in Lorrha), current Irish hurling manager and former player
Patrick (Bonner) Maher (born 1989), current Irish sportsperson playing on the Tipperary senior hurling team.

External links
 Lorrha Development association

See also
 List of civil parishes of County Tipperary
 List of towns and villages in Ireland
 Lorrha-Dorrha GAA

References

 
Towns and villages in County Tipperary
Townlands of County Tipperary
Civil parishes of Ormond Lower
Tourist attractions in County Tipperary